Boadilla del Camino is a municipality located in the province of Palencia, Castile and León, Spain. 
The name refers to the Camino de Santiago.

According to the 2004 census (INE), the municipality had a population of 166 inhabitants.

References

Municipalities in the Province of Palencia